Filain may refer to the following places in France:

 Filain, Aisne, a commune in the department of Aisne
 Filain, Haute-Saône, a commune in the department of Haute-Saône